Monument Lane railway station was a railway station in Birmingham, England, built by the London and North Western Railway on their Stour Valley Line in 1854. It served the Ladywood area of Birmingham, it was also the site of a large goods yard and a locomotive shed. In 1886, a new station was opened just north of the first station.

The station closed in 1958, although the Rugby-Birmingham-Stafford Line loop from the West Coast Main Line still runs through the site of the station today.  
Monument Lane goods yard was adjacent to the East, as was an engine shed with turntable.

There is some evidence of the station on the ground today, as there is a gap in the tracks running currently through the site at the location of an island platform.  There were calls for a new station to be built at this site to serve the International Convention Centre but this seems unlikely to happen owing to the Midland Metro extension now running to Centenary Square.

References

British History Online: Birmingham Communications

Disused railway stations in Birmingham, West Midlands
Railway stations in Great Britain opened in 1854
Railway stations in Great Britain closed in 1958
Former London and North Western Railway stations